Lawrence Brooks (August 7, 1912April 15, 1994) was an American singer and actor.

Biography

Brooks was born in Westbrook, Maine)

He was a singer and actor who had an active career performing in musicals and operettas throughout the United States during the 1940s through the 1960s.

He drew particular acclaim for his portrayal of composer Edvard Grieg in the original 1944 Broadway production of Robert Wright and George Forrest's Song of Norway.
 
He died in Fort Lauderdale, Florida, in 1994, aged 81.

References

External links
 

American male musical theatre actors
20th-century American male opera singers
1912 births
1994 deaths
People from Westbrook, Maine
Male actors from Maine
Singers from Maine
20th-century American male actors